"I Zoi (To Pio Omorfo Tragoudi)" is a song by Greek singer Demy. It was released as a digital download in [Greece on 29 October 2012 as the fifth single from her debut studio album #1 (2012). The song also peaked at number 1 on the Greek Singles Chart.

Music video
A music video to accompany the release of "I Zoi (To Pio Omorfo Tragoudi)" was first released onto YouTube on 24 November 2012 at a total length of three minutes and forty-one seconds. gv

Track listing

Charts

Release history
cxddfft

References

2012 songs
2012 singles